The 2018–19 Reading F.C. Women season was the club's 12th season and their third in the FA Women's Super League, the highest level of the football pyramid.

Season events
On 2 July, Reading announced that Jade Moore, Jo Potter and Remi Allen had all extended their contracts with Reading for the 2018–19 season.

On 5 July, Reading announced the signing of Rachael Laws from Sunderland.

On 9 July, Reading announced the double signing of Gemma Davison and Sophie Howard.

On 22 July, Reading signed Millie Farrow from Bristol City.

On 23 July, Reading signed Maz Pacheco from Doncaster Rovers Belles.

On 28 January, Reading announced the signing of Rakel Hönnudóttir from Limhamn Bunkeflo.

On 4 April, Lauren Bruton extended her contract with Reading until the summer of 2021. 

On 9 May, Fara Williams signed a new contract with Reading for the 2019–20 season.

Squad

Transfers

In

Loans in

Out

Released

Competitions

WSL

Results summary

Results by matchday

Results

Table

FA Cup

League Cup

Group stage

Knockout stage

Squad statistics

Appearances 

|-
|colspan="14"|Players away from the club on loan:
|-
|colspan="14"|Players who appeared for Reading but left during the season:
|}

Goal scorers

Clean sheets

Disciplinary record

References 

Reading